Raseyn (1923–1959) was an Arabian stallion foaled in 1923 and bred by Lady Wentworth of the Crabbet Arabian Stud.  After being imported into the United States by W.K. Kellogg in 1926.  He was part of a large shipment of horses that Carl Schmidt, later Carl Raswan, purchased from Lady Wentworth for Kellogg's new ranch in Pomona, California.

Upon arrival in America, he was registered as number 597 with the Arabian Horse Club of America.  Raseyn went on to sire twenty foal crops consisting of 135 purebred foals, including one National Champion. He was a gray horse who was very dark as a young animal, then lightened into a dapple gray for many years before his hair coat became completely white.

He was used as a jumper when he was young, and was also a five-gaited horse, able to perform the rack and the slow gait that are more typically found in the American Saddlebred. He passed this trait on to some of his descendants 

After a number of years on the Kellogg ranch, he developed arthritis, possibly due to overuse as a young horse.  When he was 25 years old, it was discovered that he had also become sterile.  Instead of being euthanized, he was given to Alice Payne 1948. He lived with Mrs. Payne another four years, the last two in the company of another famous Skowronek son, Raffles, and died on May 19, 1952.

Pedigree

Notes

References

 All Breed Pedigree Database Pedigree for Raseyn accessed on October 22, 2007
 
 
 
 

Individual Arabian and part-Arabian horses